Nieledew  is a village in the administrative district of Gmina Trzeszczany, within Hrubieszów County, Lublin Voivodeship, in eastern Poland.

The village has a population of 1,700.

References

Nieledew